Li Na defeated Dominika Cibulková in the final, 7–6(7–3), 6–0 to win the women's singles tennis title at the 2014 Australian Open. It was her second major singles title. Li saved a match point en route to the title, in the third round against Lucie Šafářová, and became the first Asian champion at the Australian Open.

Victoria Azarenka was the two-time defending champion, but was defeated by Agnieszka Radwańska in the quarterfinals, ending her 18-match winning streak at the Australian Open.

By winning her third-round match, Serena Williams surpassed Margaret Court's record of 60 match victories at the Australian Open. She lost to Ana Ivanovic in the fourth round, ending her 25-match winning streak dating back to the 2013 US Open.

Eugenie Bouchard became the first Canadian to reach a major semifinal since Carling Bassett-Seguso at the 1984 US Open.

This event marked the first major main draw appearance for future world No. 4 and Olympic gold medalist Belinda Bencic, who lost to Li in the second round.

Seeds 

  Serena Williams (fourth round)
  Victoria Azarenka (quarterfinals)
  Maria Sharapova (fourth round)
  Li Na (champion)
  Agnieszka Radwańska (semifinals)
  Petra Kvitová (first round)
  Sara Errani (first round)
  Jelena Janković (fourth round)
  Angelique Kerber (fourth round)
  Caroline Wozniacki (third round)
  Simona Halep  (quarterfinals)
  Roberta Vinci (first round)
  Sloane Stephens (fourth round)
  Ana Ivanovic (quarterfinals)
  Sabine Lisicki (second round)
  Carla Suárez Navarro (third round)
  Samantha Stosur (third round)

  Kirsten Flipkens (second round)
  Svetlana Kuznetsova (first round)
  Dominika Cibulková (final)
  Sorana Cîrstea (first round)
  Ekaterina Makarova (fourth round)
  Elena Vesnina (first round)
  Kaia Kanepi (first round)
  Alizé Cornet (third round)
  Lucie Šafářová (third round)
  Jamie Hampton (withdrew because of a hip injury)
  Flavia Pennetta (quarterfinals)
  Anastasia Pavlyuchenkova (third round)
  Eugenie Bouchard (semifinals)
  Daniela Hantuchová (third round)
  Magdaléna Rybáriková (second round)
  Bojana Jovanovski (second round)

Qualifying

Wildcards

Draw

Finals

Top half

Section 1

Section 2

Section 3

Section 4

Bottom half

Section 5

Section 6

Section 7

Section 8

Championship match statistics

References
General

Women drawsheet on ausopen.com

Specific

External links
 2014 Australian Open – Women's draws and results at the International Tennis Federation

Women's Singles
2014
2014 in Australian women's sport
2014 WTA Tour